Carrington is a city in Foster County, North Dakota, United States. It is the county seat of Foster County. The population was 2,080 at the 2020 census. Carrington was founded in 1883.

Carrington is home to Dakota Growers Pasta Company, Inc.

History
Carrington was platted in 1882 by M. D. Carrington, and named for him. Carrington has been the county seat since 1883. A post office has been in operation at Carrington since 1883.

Geography
Carrington's zip code is 58421. The area code is 701. Carrington has five local phone exchanges: 307, 649, 650, 652 and 653.

Demographics

2010 census
As of the census of 2010, there were 2,065 people, 951 households, and 540 families living in the city. The racial makeup of the city was 98.1% White, 0.1% African American, 0.7% Native American, 0.1% Asian, 0.1% from other races, and 0.8% from two or more races. Hispanic or Latino of any race were 0.7% of the population.

There were 951 households, of which 22.5% had children under the age of 18 living with them, 47.3% were married couples living together, 6.3% had a female householder with no husband present, 3.2% had a male householder with no wife present, and 43.2% were non-families. 38.5% of all households were made up of individuals, and 19.5% had someone living alone who was 65 years of age or older. The average household size was 2.11 and the average family size was 2.81.

The median age in the city was 46 years. 21.7% of residents were under the age of 18; 6.2% were between the ages of 18 and 24; 20.7% were from 25 to 44; 26.8% were from 45 to 64; and 24.8% were 65 years of age or older. The gender makeup of the city was 48.2% male and 51.8% female.

2000 census
As of the census of 2000, there were 2,268 people, 961 households, and 594 families living in the city. The population density was 1,531.9 people per square mile (591.7/km2). There were 1,057 housing units at an average density of 713.9 per square mile (275.8/km2). The racial makeup of the city was 98.81% White, 0.18% African American, 0.49% Native American, 0.09% from other races, and 0.44% from two or more races. Hispanic or Latino of any race were 0.22% of the population.

There were 961 households, out of which 31.0% had children under the age of 18 living with them, 50.8% were married couples living together, 8.4% had a female householder with no husband present, and 38.1% were non-families. 35.6% of all households were made up of individuals, and 18.3% had someone living alone who was 65 years of age or older. The average household size was 2.27 and the average family size was 2.97.

In the city, the population was spread out, with 25.4% under the age of 18, 6.0% from 18 to 24, 26.8% from 25 to 44, 18.7% from 45 to 64, and 23.1% who were 65 years of age or older. The median age was 40 years. For every 100 females, there were 90.6 males. For every 100 females age 18 and over, there were 87.3 males.

The median income for a household in the city was $31,197, and the median income for a family was $41,654. Males had a median income of $31,250 versus $19,722 for females. The per capita income for the city was $19,012. About 7.0% of families and 8.9% of the population were below the poverty line, including 10.8% of those under age 18 and 11.0% of those age 65 or over.

Local media

Print
 Foster County Independent

AM Radio

Television
Midcontinent Communications provides cable service to the city of Carrington and New Rockford. Dakota Central Telecommunications provides cable service to Carrington, Jamestown, and other nearby communities.

Education
The city of Carrington is served by Carrington Elementary School and Carrington High School. Prairie View Adventist School is also in Carrington.

Transportation
Two federal highways pass through Carrington. U.S. 281 runs north to south through the area. U.S. 52 runs east and west, co-signed with ND 200 and to U.S. 281, then runs northwest and southeast route. ND 200 runs east and west through the area.

Highways that run through Carrington include U.S. 52, U.S. 281, ND 200 and Foster County CR 1605. The city is also served by both the Canadian Pacific Railway and the Red River Valley and Western Railroad.

Major roads and streets

North and south
 4th Avenue U.S. Route 281 (City Park, Crossroads Golf Course, residential, commercial, industrial)
 11th Avenue (North of Main Street) (residential, commercial, industrial)
 13th Avenue (South of Main Street) (residential, industrial)
 14th Avenue (South of Main Street) (residential, industrial)
 66th Avenue SE 19th Avenue (Old Hwy 281) (Foster County Fairgrounds, industrial)

East and west
 11th Street North (Dakota Growers, industrial)
 Highway 200 Carrington Airport, residential, commercial, industrial)
 Main Street (Carrington High School, residential, central business district, commercial, industrial)
 3rd Street South (City Park, Stadium of 76, Foster County Fairgrounds, residential)
 7th Street South (residential, industrial)

Notable people

 Laura J. Eisenhuth, North Dakota Superintendent of Public Instruction, 1893–1894; first woman elected to statewide office in the United States
 Clinton J. Hall, lawyer and Minnesota state representative
 Jim Kleinsasser, tight end for the Minnesota Vikings
 Larry Woiwode, author and North Dakota poet laureate

Climate
This climatic region is typified by large seasonal temperature differences, with warm to hot (and often humid) summers and cold (sometimes severely cold) winters.  According to the Köppen Climate Classification system, Carrington has a humid continental climate, abbreviated "Dfb" on climate maps.

References

External links

 Carrington, North Dakota: community fact survey (1964) from the Digital Horizons website
 Carrington :prairie heartland, Carrington, North Dakota (1975) from the Digital Horizons website

 
Cities in North Dakota
Cities in Foster County, North Dakota
County seats in North Dakota
Populated places established in 1882
1882 establishments in Dakota Territory